American Advisors Group (AAG) is an American reverse mortgage lender. It provides government-insured Home Equity Conversion Mortgage (HECM) loans and has 81 geographical areas approved for business by HUD.

History 

The group was founded in 2004 by Reza Jahangiri, president and chief executive officer.

In June 2009 the company received a capital-infusion commitment from private-equity firm JAM Equity Partners of El Segundo, California, an investment said to give AAG "the resources needed to compete on a national level with a celebrity spokesperson and [to] build a recognizable brand." At the same time, the company announced "a new management team" from Liberty Reverse Mortgage/Genworth and the Senior Lending Network. Jahangiri told Reverse Mortgage Daily that the company would be "sticking with retail" rather than moving to other aspects of the business.

Thefirm completed its first Home Mortgage-Backed Security
(HMBS) issuance in July 2013, after receiving approval from Ginnie Mae, in a program said to be "an essential financial solution for a growing number of senior citizens.". The company was named as the leading HMBS issuer for the first half of 2015, according to NewView Advisors, LLC.

Scope

AAG provides government-insured Home Equity Conversion Mortgage (HECM) loans and has 81 HUD-approved areas for business. The organization is headquartered in Orange County, California.

The firm launched its wholesale division in June 2012. It launched its National Field Sales (NFS) division in 2014.

Marketing

Spokespeople

In October 2009, the firm announced that film and television actor Peter Graves had been selected as the spokesperson for the second half of the company's national media campaign, which in its first phase had featured "personalized stories" of the way that reverse mortgages had affected homeowners. He remained spokesman until his death in March 2010.

Former U.S. Senator Fred Thompson of Tennessee became the AAG spokesman in May 2010 until his death on November 1st, 2015. Their latest spokesman as of 2021 is actor Tom Selleck.

References 

Financial services companies of the United States
American companies established in 2004
Financial services companies established in 2004
Mortgage lenders of the United States
Companies based in Orange, California
2004 establishments in California
2004 establishments in the United States
Companies established in 2004